Impatiens textori is a species of plant in the family Balsaminaceae. It is native to East Asia, including China, Japan, and the Korean Peninsula.

References

textori
Flora of Korea